Yanıkses is a village in the Eruh District of Siirt Province in Turkey. The village had a population of 139 in 2021.

Notable people 

 Zübeyir Aydar

References 

Villages in Eruh District
Kurdish settlements in Siirt Province